Var or VAR may refer to:

Places
 Var (department), a department of France
 Var (river), France
 Vār, Iran, village in West Azerbaijan Province, Iran
 Var, Iran (disambiguation), other places in Iran
 Vár, a village in Obreja commune, Caraș-Severin County, Romania
 Var, a village in Jibou town, Sălaj County, Romania
 Var (Olt), a river in Harghita County, Romania
 VAR, the IATA airport code for Varna Airport, Bulgaria

Mythology, arts and entertainment
 Vár, a goddess in Norse mythology
 Var or vara, an enclosure built by Jamshid (Yima) in Zoroastrian mythology
 Var (poetry), a type of Punjabi poem
 Vår jul, a Swedish Christmas album from 2010
 Var the Stick, part of the Battle Circle trilogy by Piers Anthony

Science and technology
 , a directory on Unix-like computer systems, see Filesystem Hierarchy Standard
 , an HTML tag
 Vacuum arc remelting (VAR), a process for production of steel and special alloys
 Value-added reseller (VAR), an economic term primarily used in the technology industry
 Variable (computer science), in programming languages
 Variance, often represented Var(X), in statistics
 Variety (botany) (var.), a taxonomic rank
 Value at risk (VaR), in economics and finance
 Vector autoregression (VAR), an econometric method of analysis
 Visual Aural Radio Range (VAR), a radio navigation aid for aircraft
 Volt-ampere reactive (var), a unit which is the imaginary counterpart of the watt

Sport
 Video assistant referee (VAR), in association football (soccer)
 Van Amersfoort Racing, an auto racing team based in the Netherlands

Other uses
 Vara, an old Spanish and Portuguese unit of length; see Spanish customary units
 Free Anti Revolutionary Party, a former political party

See also
 Variable (disambiguation)
 Variant (disambiguation)
 Variety (disambiguation)
 Vara (disambiguation)
 Vars (disambiguation)